An Jung-hwa (born 20 February 1981) is a South Korean handball player who competed at the 2008 Summer Olympics.

In 2008, she won a bronze medal with the South Korean team.

References

External links

Living people
South Korean female handball players
Olympic handball players of South Korea
Handball players at the 2008 Summer Olympics
Olympic bronze medalists for South Korea
Olympic medalists in handball
Medalists at the 2008 Summer Olympics
Asian Games medalists in handball
Handball players at the 2006 Asian Games
1981 births
Asian Games gold medalists for South Korea
Medalists at the 2006 Asian Games
21st-century South Korean women